Sajan Soorya is an Indian actor who is known for his appearances in Malayalam soap operas. He has won several allocates including four ''Asianet Television Awards for Best actor.

He has done over 100 television series and has established himself as the most bankable actor in malayalam television. Before foraying into Television , he has done theatre performances under his own troupe Arya Communication. Currently he owns a production company named  Trio.

Personal life
Sajan was born to Satheeshan and Suryakala. He is a Lower Division Clerk in Registration Department of Kerala government. He is married to Vineetha and the couple has two daughters. They live in Trivandrum.

Acting credits
 Television serials (partial)

Other television shows
Aram+Aram=Kinnaram (2021) as team captain
Let's rock and roll (2021) as Contestant
Kutty Chef (2020) as Judge
Thakarppan Comedy (2019) as Contestant
Urvashi Theatre (2018) as himself in Promo
Sell Me the Answer as Contestant
Ningalkkum Aakaam Kodeeshwaran as Contestant
Onnum Onnum Moonu as Participant
Munch Stars (2013) as Contestant

Filmography

Music videos
Snehathepatty Onnum Parayaruthu 
Muhabathin Kaalathu
Sree Mayadurga
Ninnodithiri
Oh Fathima
Rosappoovin Niramanu
Manasariyum Koottukari
Gurudevan
Sarana Veedhi
Peralaserry Srimurugan
Oru Naal
Keralam Gathi Maatum

Telefilms
Aa divasangalil Parayanirunnathu
Nizhal Mathram
Shankarananda
Nizhal
Thondimuthal
Oru Yathrayude Anthyam

References

Indian male television actors
Male actors in Malayalam television
Male actors in Malayalam cinema
Year of birth missing (living people)
Living people
21st-century Indian male actors